Tom Cushman (born May 28, 1964) is an American speed skater. He competed in the men's 1000 metres event at the 1988 Winter Olympics.

References

External links
 

1964 births
Living people
American male speed skaters
Olympic speed skaters of the United States
Speed skaters at the 1988 Winter Olympics
Speed skaters from Saint Paul, Minnesota